Aleksa may refer to:

Aleksa (given name)
Aleksa (surname)
Belarusian spelling of name Oleksa